Allonne is a commune in the Oise department in northern France.

History
The R101 British airship crashed during the night of October 5, 1930, in Allonne during its maiden overseas voyage, between London and Karachi, killing 48 people.

Population

See also
 Communes of the Oise department

References

Communes of Oise